Flicka: Country Pride is a 2012 American direct-to-DVD family film and a sequel to Flicka (2006) and Flicka 2  (2010). Directed by Michael Damian, it stars Clint Black, Lisa Hartman Black, Kacey Rohl and Siobhan Williams.

Plot
Toby (Clint Black) comes to Cherry Creek Farms to serve as stable manager for a family in financial and emotional stress. Kelly Jenkins (Kacey Rohl) is a teenage horse lover who lives on the ranch with her mother, Lindy (Lisa Hartman). Her father died in an accident, and the stables have had increasing difficulty making a profit since.

Toby brings Flicka with him, and Kelly quickly befriends the beautiful horse. Kelly's former friend, Stephanie Meyers, boards her horse at the stables. Stephanie felt slighted by Kelly after her father died. She develops a growing dislike of Kelly and increasingly treats her like some lower class servant. When Stephanie's dressage teammate is injured, Flicka helps Kelly win a spot on the team, much to Stephanie's chagrin. The jealousy grows even worse when Briggs McBride, the team's male member, shows more interest in Kelly than Stephanie. The hatred grows to the point that Stephanie challenges Kelly to a race in which the loser would leave for good. Out of annoyance to Stephanie's constant bad treatment, Kelly accepts. The two females battle each other on the field until Stephanie falls off of her horse and Kelly is declared the winner. Enraged, Stephanie leaves the team and her friends follow. Kelly becomes so horrified that she sunk the team that would have saved the stable that she rides off into the night. However, Toby pursues her and convinces her to come back, as her mother is more worried about her than the stable. Encouraged by Briggs, Kelly puts together a team of unconvincing, yet talented teens to compete in the national horse competition. Kelly and her team take on Stephanie's team. The competition lasts quite a while until Kelly pulls of the best performance in the end. Stephanie is impressed and notices that Kelly sees the same talent in people as her dad did. The two rivals become friends again and near the final, Stephanie is declared the winner and Kelly is given the second place. Because Kelly won runner up in the competition, she now has enough money to save the stable and keep her mom and Toby together. Kelly gets her happy ending.

Cast
 Clint Black as Toby
 Lisa Hartman Black as Lindy Jenkins
 Kacey Rohl as Kelly Jenkins
 Siobhan Williams as Stephanie Meyers
 Lily Pearl Black as Nina Meyers 
 Teryl Rothery as Paige 
 Max Lloyd-Jones as Briggs McBride
 Emily Bett Rickards as Mary 
 Rusty Humphries as Announcer 
 Laura Soltis as Mrs. Meyers 
 Katherine King as Amber
 Kelsey McNabb as Receina
 Landon Blackstock as Billy The Groom 
 Peter-John Prinsloo as James
 Alexander Calvert as Jesse
 Rustin Gresiuk as Alex 
 Holly Kay as Singer
 Dave Leader as Digger

Production
Filming took place in Kelowna, British Columbia.

Release
The film premiered at the Newport Beach Film Festival in May 2012, and was released on Blu-ray and DVD in May of the same year.

Soundtrack
 "Are You Listening" - written by Brad Swanson and Jeff Gold, performed by Christina Gonzales Sikola 
 "Man of the Law" - performed by Buck McCoy 
 "Open Road"
 "Dancing 4 My Life" - performed by Ida LaFontaine
 "Dance Like You're Invisible" - written and performed by Holly Kay 
 "With You" - written and performed by Holly Kay 
 "I'm so over you" - performed by Joe Liaye
 "Give your heart wings" - written and performed by Holly Kay 
 "Rebel Angel" - written and performed by Jayson Bendera 
 "Let go" - written and performed by Holly Kay

References

External links
 

2012 direct-to-video films
2012 films
20th Century Fox direct-to-video films
Direct-to-video sequel films
Films about horses
Films set in Wyoming
Films directed by Michael Damian
2010s English-language films